Claire's (formerly known as Claire's Boutiques, Claire's Boutique and Claire's Accessories) is an American retailer of accessories, jewelry, and toys primarily aimed toward tween and teen
girls. It was founded in 1961 and is based in Hoffman Estates, Illinois, a suburb of Chicago. The company is primarily owned by Elliott Management and Monarch Alternative Capital, but in 2022 announced plans to go public with an initial public offering.

As of October 27, 2012, Claire's has 3,469 stores in 37 countries. Claire's claims it has done more ear piercings than any other retailer, totaling at over 100 million in 25+ years.

History

In 1961, Rowland Schaefer founded Fashion Tress Industries, a company that sold wigs and became the world's largest retailer for fashion wigs. In 1973, Fashion Tress acquired Claire's, a 25-store jewelry chain, and began shifting its focus towards a line of fashion jewelry and accessories under the new name, Claire's Accessories, Inc. Claire's Accessories began providing ear piercing services in 1978 and, in 1980, established a Hong Kong-based sourcing office. During the 1980s, Claire's Accessories opened new stores throughout the United States and bought Topkapi, a Japanese chain of 16 stores, in 1989. Claire's Accessories continued acquiring companies in the 1990s, including Bow Bangles — a British chain with 71 stores in England, Wales, and Scotland — in 1995; two American chains, The Icing (85 stores) and Accessory Place (31 stores), in 1996; and Bijoux One, a Swiss chain, in 1998. The Icing would become the company's primary brand for women in their 20s. In 1999, Claire's purchased Cleopatre, a chain in Paris with 42 stores, for $11 million cash, as well the American chain, Afterthoughts. Afterthoughts stores were converted to Icing stores after they were purchased. In 1997, the business changed its name to Claire's. In 2001, claires.com was launched. In 2002, the company purchased the US-based clothing chain Mr. Rags.

Claire's was a publicly-traded company listed on the NASDAQ in 2005, but was taken private by the private equity firm Apollo Global Management in a $3.1 billion leveraged buyout in 2007. In 2008, Claire's consolidated its European operations into one group with headquarters in Birmingham. The first stores in Ukraine were opened in 2010. In 2011, e-commerce operations were launched in the United States, alongside the opening of stores in India and Mexico. In 2012, Claire's expanded its international presence by opening its first stores in China, Italy, Indonesia, Luxembourg, Dominican Republic, Panama, and Honduras.

In 2018, Claire's filed for Chapter 11 bankruptcy in the U.S. But by 2022, Claire’s had exited bankruptcy, announced preliminary sales growth for fiscal year 2021 of 53% on revenue of $1.4 billion, and announced plans for an initial public offering. The company's new strategy involves shuttering stores in underperforming locations in favor of "prestige" malls, as well as setting up kiosk shops within drug and grocery store chains.

Offices
As of 2014 Claire's has 6 offices:
 Hoffman Estates, Illinois (a suburb of Chicago): Global HQ, North America HQ, North America Distribution Center
 Birmingham: Europe HQ, Europe Distribution Center
 Hong Kong: Sourcing & Buying, International Distribution Center
 Pembroke Pines, Florida (a suburb of Miami): Accounting
 Paris: Field Support
 Madrid: Field Support

Illinois office
Claire's has its Illinois offices in Hoffman Estates, Illinois, a suburb of Chicago. The facility is a brown brick building off of Interstate 90, near Barrington Road. The building serves as Claire's distribution center and main facility, and all merchandise is routed through this facility. Its products, which, as of 1996, are mainly imported, are distributed and marketed through the Hoffman Estates location. The company's buying, distribution, and marketing divisions are in the Hoffman Estates facility. As of 1996, 236 full-time employees and several temporary employees worked in the facility. Leslie Mann of the Chicago Tribune said that the facility "contrasts with Claire's glittery stores in the United States, Canada, Puerto Rico, the United Kingdom and Japan." Mann added, "Except for the prototype store in the lobby and the fashion accessories that line the walls of the buyers' offices, the center is unremarkable."

A facility in Wood Dale, Illinois, used to serve the purposes now held by the Hoffman Estates office. In early January 1995, Pfizer sold its Hoffman Estates headquarters building for $7.4 million to Claire's so it could consolidate its operations in Memphis, Tennessee. At the time, the Hoffman Estates office had  of space. In 1998, Claire's announced plans to build a two-story office building and a  warehouse at the Hoffman Estates site. This would double the total amount of space at the Illinois site.

Florida office
Its Florida office in Pembroke Pines, Florida, in Greater Miami. The Florida offices are west of the intersection of Flamingo Road and Pines Boulevard. It has  of space in its Florida offices. The current CEO for Claire's is Ryan Vero As of 1997 the CEO has his office in Pembroke Pines. In addition, the company's customer service and investor relations divisions are located in the Pembroke Pines offices. In November 1990 Claire's moved its Florida offices from northern Dade County to Pembroke Pines. The former headquarters in Dade County had  of space.

Store types 

Stores are aimed at teens and tweens and have a kids' sections. They average about 1,000 square feet, are typically located in malls and shopping centers, and carry the widest selection of merchandise among Claire's brands. Merchandise is targeted at different age groups ranging from babies to teens. Customers can find earrings, necklaces, bracelets, purses, hair accessories, fashion accessories, stuffed animals, makeup, and licensed merchandise. Stores are merchandised to accommodate different ages, and fashion trends are manipulated to appeal to all ages. Toys "R" Us also included a Claire's section for girls and teens.

In North America, Claire's also operates under the Icing brand, stores targeted toward women aged 19–28. The merchandise has a higher price point and is more mature. Most items are accessories and jewelry, but merchandise also includes items like candles, mineral-based cosmetics, birthday accessories, bachelorette and wedding accessories, and footwear. Icing typically does not offer licensed merchandise.

Merchandise 
Claire's sells accessories that are geared towards kids, tweens, teens, and young adults and are meant to imitate high-end fashion trends. Costume jewelry, imitation jewelry of precious gems and materials like pearls and diamonds, branded merchandise that advertise tween musicians, body jewelry, hair accessories, make-up and clothing items are usually available for purchases.

The store's merchandise is often divided into sections. Claire's Club is a line of accessories meant for children under 7 years old, featuring princess-themed jewelry and accessories with children's musicians such as Sophia Grace & Rosie. The rest of the store is for tweens and teens.

Claire's also carries an assortment of seasonal holiday items, such as for Valentine's Day, St. Patrick's Day, Easter, 4th of July, Halloween, and Christmas.

Nearly all locations also offer ear piercing, as all staff are fully trained in using the Studex gun. Claire's starts piercing customers at the age of two months with their 8-week immunizations and does not pierce the cartilage of people under 13 years of age. Although the target customers are girls and young women, as fashion trends have changed, the place has become popular for young boys to get their ears pierced as well.

Claire's carries its own range of perfumes and jewelry.

Asbestos recalls 
Claire's have been subject to numerous cases of alleged "asbestos presence" in its products. These traces have been found in products containing talcum powder, a naturally occurring silicate substance. Talcum powder has been known to contain traces of asbestos, a recognized human carcinogen.

On March 5, 2019, Claire's stated that the Food and Drug Administration (FDA) believed some of the company's products may have been contaminated with asbestos. Claire's stated that the FDA had "mis-characterized fibers in the products as asbestos, in direct contradiction to established EPA and USP criterion for classifying asbestos fibers".

On March 11, 2019, the FDA tested more Claire's products, indicating "the possible presence of asbestos". The affected products were sold between October 2016 to March 2019. In response to the FDA claim, Claire's stated they continue to have confidence in the safety of their products, however also issued a voluntary recall and advised consumers to discontinue use.

On May 30, 2019, a JoJo Siwa cosmetic kit was voluntarily recalled due to the FDA warning consumers of "the possible presence of asbestos". The powder eyeshadow element of the kit was affected due to the possible presence of "trace amounts of asbestos fibers". Claire's stated these trace amounts were acceptable by European and Canadian cosmetic regulations, and they had ended the use of talc powder in its products. The company still "continues to have confidence in the safety and composition of its products" and "is not aware of any adverse reactions, injuries or illness caused by the possible presence of asbestos in the recalled products". Siwa posted a video informing her audience Claire's would accept refunds of products new and used, stating she puts her "trust into other people's hands" with her products and was working to recall items from all shelves.

References

External links
 Claire's
 Icing
 Claire's Stores, Inc. corporate site

F. W. Woolworth Company
Private equity portfolio companies
Apollo Global Management companies
American companies established in 1961
Clothing companies established in 1961
Retail companies established in 1961
2007 mergers and acquisitions
Jewelry retailers of the United States
Companies based in Cook County, Illinois
Companies that filed for Chapter 11 bankruptcy in 2018
1961 establishments in Illinois
Hoffman Estates, Illinois